(also erroneously named Ueshima Island) is the second largest island in the Amakusa archipelago of Japan. The western part of Kamishima Island is administered as part of Amakusa city, while eastern part is administered as part of Kami-Amakusa city. The island's highest peak is Mount Kuratake .

Transportation
The Five Bridges of Amakusa connects the Kamishima Island to the Kyushu mainland since 1966. Additionally, the  connects Kamishima to Shimoshima island - the largest island in Amakusa archipelago. The national roads serving the island are the Route 266 and Route 324

Climate
Kamishima Island is located in the humid subtropical climate zone (Köppen Cfa), with four distinct seasons. Winters tend to be sunny, windy, and relatively dry; snow falls occasionally in the higher elevations, but seldom near sea level. Spring in Kamishima Island starts off mild, but ends up being hot and humid. The summer tends to be Kamishima's wettest season, with the  — the rainy season — occurring between early June (average: June 7) to late July (average: July 21). The island's weather is affected by the nearby  while being shielded from the warm Kuroshio Current off the coast of Kyushu island, resulting in a wetter and colder climate than should be expected at those latitudes.

Attractions

Five Bridges of Amakusa

Notable people
Amakusa Shirō

See also

Islands with similar names
Kami-shima
Kamino-shima
Kamijima, Ehime

Other related
Amakusa
Shimoshima Island, Amakusa
This article incorporates material from Japanese Wikipedia page 上島 (天草諸島), accessed 4 August 2017

References

External links
 熊本県の島＞＞天草上島（あまくさかみしま）

Islands of Kumamoto Prefecture
Islands of the East China Sea